Guilsfield Football Club is a football team, founded in 1957 in Guilsfield, near Welshpool, Wales. Guilsfield play in the Cymru North, which is in the second level of the Welsh football league system.

History
A team was founded in Guilsfield by a Mr A.C. Perkins in October 1879.

Honours

Central Wales Challenge Cup – Winners: 2005–06, 2013–14
Central Wales Challenge Cup – Runners-up: 2017–18

References

Football clubs in Wales
Association football clubs established in 1957
1957 establishments in Wales
Cymru Alliance clubs
Cymru North clubs
Mid Wales Football League clubs